Lawrence J. Hubert (born 23 May 1944) is an American psychologist and statistician.

Hubert earned a doctorate from Stanford University under Lee Cronbach and Patrick Suppes, and held professorships in psychology (later as Lyle H. Lanier Professor) and statistics at the University of Illinois at Urbana–Champaign. Hubert was elected a foreign member of the Royal Netherlands Academy of Arts and Sciences in 2007. The Psychometric Society gave him the Career Award for Lifetime Achievement in 2015.

References

1944 births
Living people
21st-century American psychologists
American statisticians
Harvard University alumni
Members of the Royal Netherlands Academy of Arts and Sciences
Psychometricians
University of Illinois Urbana-Champaign faculty
Quantitative psychologists
20th-century American psychologists